Carpe Diem is the eleventh studio album of Nigerian rapper Olamide and his first body of work under American label and distribution company, Empire Distribution. According to The Olamide Music Chart on Twitter, Carpe Diem crossed the 500 million stream mark across all dsps on June 1, 2021.

Background 
In July 2020, Olamide announced he had finished recording his album. He released the tracklist for the album on the 1st of October 2020 featuring Fireboy DML, Bad Boy Timz, Omah Lay, Phyno, Peruzzi and Bella Shmurda. Album production credits to Young John, Pheelz, ID Cabasa, P.Priime, VStix.

Critical reception

Carpe Diem received positive reviews from music critics with most critics acknowledging Olamide's brilliance on the project. Motolani Alake of Pulse NG stated that Carpe Diem is only bettered by Baddest Guy Ever Liveth in Olamide’s discography, he praised Olamide by saying "It also has zero fillers and it has a topical sonic and topical cohesion merged with a topical progression that no other Olamide album has. It’s his calmest and most methodical bit of music and it marries contemporary conformity with a unique identity". A writer for NATIVE in a more enthusiastic way said that Carpe Diem is a solid project and a stark reminder that the afropop/rap landscape is always changing and with the boisterous 12-tracks on this project, he stated that Olamide continues to show why he will always have the clubs and streets on in a chokehold while giving listeners a newer more-refined side of him. Although the project has its fair share of filler tracks neatly packaged in the form of love songs, Olamide’s unbridled confidence in his abilities and that of the upcoming artists he takes under his wings marks the project’s sweet spot.  Naijaloaded awarded the album 8 stars out of 10 while Olalekan Okeremilekun of Tooxclusive gave a 5/5 rating stating that the album shows growth and innovation, but it has a lot of contenders and only time will tell its place in a year when a lot of artistes have made efforts to transcend their previous efforts. However, for now, it's worth listening to. A writer for Gilox have the opinion that Carpe Diem is perhaps the most brilliant display of a musical mastermind that Olamide Baddo is with a 8/10 rating.

Track listing

Charts

500 Million Streams
According to the Olamide Music Chart on Twitter, Carpe Diem surpassed 500 Million streams across all the recognized music streaming platforms on June 1(8moths after its release). This made Olamide the first rapper in Africa to achieve this milestone in a very short time

Awards and nominations

References

2020 albums
Olamide albums